Maikori is a Nigerian surname. The name "Maikori" means "master of the quiver".

Notable people with the surname include:

Adamu Maikori (1942–2020), Nigerian lawyer, banker, and politician
Audu Maikori (born 1975), Nigerian lawyer, entrepreneur, social activist, and public speaker
Yahaya Maikori, Nigerian lawyer, brother of Audu

References

Surnames of Nigerian origin